Carex turkestanica is a species of true sedge in the family Cyperaceae, native to the Altai, Central Asia (except Turkmenistan), Afghanistan, Pakistan, the western Himalayas, and Xinjiang and Gansu in China. It is found in a wide variety of mountainous habitats, where it is often co-dominant.

References

turkestanica
Flora of Altai (region)
Flora of Central Asia
Flora of Afghanistan
Flora of Pakistan
Flora of West Himalaya
Flora of Xinjiang
Flora of North-Central China
Plants described in 1881